Jewel Food may refer to:
 Jewel (supermarket), an American grocery store chain
 Jewel Food Stores (Australia), an Australian supermarket chain